Yaroslav Yuryevich Mikhaylov (born 28 April 2003) is a Russian professional footballer who plays as an attacking midfielder for Pari NN on loan from Zenit Saint Petersburg.

Club career
On 13 July 2021, Mikhaylov moved from FC Zenit Saint Petersburg to Schalke 04 on a loan deal until the end of the season, after taking part in Schalke training as a guest player for three weeks. He made his professional debut for Schalke in the 2. Bundesliga on 1 August 2021, coming on as a substitute in the 65th minute in a 3–0 away win against Holstein Kiel.

Upon his return from loan, on 21 June 2022 Mikhaylov made his first appearance for Zenit's first squad in a pre-season game against FC Pari Nizhny Novgorod. He made his Russian Premier League debut for Zenit on 30 July 2022 against FC Lokomotiv Moscow.

On 9 September 2022, Mikhaylov joined Pari NN on loan with an option to buy.

International career
Mikhaylov has played several matches for the Russian U-17, U-18 and U-19 national teams.

Career statistics

Honours
Schalke 04
2. Bundesliga: 2021–22

References

External links
 
 
 

2003 births
Sportspeople from Pskov
Living people
Russian footballers
Russia youth international footballers
Russia under-21 international footballers
Association football midfielders
FC Zenit Saint Petersburg players
FC Schalke 04 players
FC Zenit-2 Saint Petersburg players
FC Nizhny Novgorod (2015) players
2. Bundesliga players
Russian Premier League players
Russian Second League players
Russian expatriate footballers
Russian expatriate sportspeople in Germany
Expatriate footballers in Germany